Western Antioquia is a subregion in the Colombian Department of Antioquia. The region is made up by 18 municipalities.

Municipalities

 Abriaquí
 Antioquia
 Anza
 Armenia
 Buritica
 Cañasgordas
 Dabeiba
 Ebejico
 Frontino
 Giraldo
 Heliconia
 Liborina
 Olaya
 Peque
 Sabanalarga
 San Jerónimo
 Sopetrán
 Uramita

References
 Se educa - Government of Colombia; Regions of Antioquia

Regions of Antioquia Department